Henry Boernstein [in Europe, Heinrich Börnstein] (November 4, 1805 – September 10, 1892)  was a German revolutionary who served as the publisher of the Anzeiger des Westens in St. Louis, Missouri, the oldest German newspaper west of the Mississippi River. He was also a political activist, author, soldier, actor and stage manager, and was briefly yet closely acquainted with Karl Marx during his tenure as publisher of the radical newspaper Vorwärts.  He played a major role in keeping Missouri in the Union at the start of the Civil War.

Biography

Europe
His family fled from Hamburg, his native city, to Lemberg (then in Austrian Galizia, now L'viv in Ukraine) in 1813, due to fighting between allied and French forces.  He studied half-heartedly at the University of Lemberg and then read medical literature in Vienna.  He acquired a special hostility to the Roman Catholic Church due to being required to attend Catholic catechism despite being a Protestant.

After leaving the university, Boerrnstein joined an Austrian army regiment stationed in Olmütz, Moravia, for five years, before resigning his commission as a cadet and going to Vienna.  There he became involved in journalism and theater.

He married the Hungarian actress Marie Steltzer (age 15 years) on November 13, 1829.  After a period in Vienna, Boernstein went on tour as an actor to cities in the Austrian Empire such as Budapest, Lubjana, Agram [Zagreb], Trieste and Venice, and he served as supervisor of the municipal theaters in St. Pölten and Linz.  He became both a successful theatrical entrepreneur and a popular actor.  In 1841, he and his wife toured the principal cities of Germany with great success.

His radical political views enticed him to Paris, and in 1842 he took a German opera company there, which failed to flourish.  He was a friend of Franz Liszt, Alexandre Dumas and Giacomo Meyerbeer. He managed an Italian opera company in Paris before starting a "translation factory" modifying French drama for performance in German.

In 1844 and 1845 he published the radical journal Vorwärts! Pariser Signale aus Kunst, Wissenschaft, Musik und geselligem Leben ["Advance!  Paris Signals from Art, Science, Music and Social Life"], later Vorwärts!  Pariser Deutsche Zeitschrift ["Advance!  Paris German Journal"].  It became the chief mouthpiece of Karl Marx and other Paris radicals of the time, including Friedrich Engels, Karl Ludwig Bernays, Arnold Ruge, and Heinrich Heine.  French authorities shut Vorwärts! down early in 1845, expelling or imprisoning most of those associated with the journal.

Boernstein remained in Paris, recording political events in France for newspapers that could not afford a reporter there.  He was assisted by his perennial co-worker Karl Ludwig Bernays.  Boernstein wrote articles for Horace Greeley's New-York Tribune (translated into English by Charles Anderson Dana and Bayard Taylor) as well as for German journals in America such as the Deutsche Schnellpost of New York.   At the time of the February 1848 revolution in Paris, he became president of the Société des Democrats Allemands, helping to organize a military unit under Georg Herwegh to aid the revolt in Baden.   He withdrew from the revolutionary movement when socialists insisted on a right to labor.   Throughout the 1848 Revolution in Paris he collected pamphlets and newspapers on the streets every day.  He gave this collection to the St. Louis Mercantile Library in 1853, where it remains today.   He departed France in January, 1849, after Louis Napoléon was inaugurated as President of the Second Republic.

United States
After landing in New Orleans, Boernstein passed through St. Louis, Missouri, to the Swiss community of Highland, Illinois, where he practiced as a water-cure physician until offered the editorship of the German-language newspaper Anzeiger des Westens ["Western Reporter"] in St. Louis in March, 1850.   He soon became its publisher and proprietor.

To promote circulation, he published many prominent European novelists and memoirists of the time as serials, and in 1850 he wrote a sensationalist anti-Jesuit novel, Die Geheimnisse von St. Louis [The Mysteries of St. Louis], translated subsequently into English, French and Czech.  It was in the tradition of the "urban mystery" novels of Eugène Sue (Les mystères de Paris, Le juif errant).  It had many editions in America and Germany, and it was revived in the 1870s in the context of Bismarck's Kulturkampf with the papacy.

Boernstein introduced a sensational journalistic style in his Anzeiger, raising the ire of nativist mobs, led in one case by Ned Buntline.   The Anzeiger revived the political career of former US Senator Thomas Hart Benton, winning Benton one term in the House of Representatives on behalf of "Benton Democracy."   Boernstein became an early supporter of the newly founded Republican Party, and he dramatized the fact that John Frémont was not on the ballot in Missouri in 1856 by having his followers vote for the Know-Nothing presidential candidate Millard Fillmore "under protest," since the nativist position was incidentally in tune with his hostility to Catholicism.

Boernstein's freewheeling methods earned him enemies within the German community as well as among English-speakers.  In 1857 Die westliche Post was founded as a competitor for support from "progressive" Germans.

At the start of the Civil War, Boernstein's enterprises included a brewery, a hotel, and several saloons.  In 1859 he leased the Variétés Theater in St. Louis and launched it as an opera house.  It closed when Boernstein went off to war in 1861.

In the months before Abraham Lincoln's inauguration, political tensions in St. Louis deteriorated into armed confrontation, while pro-Southern elements plotted to seize the United States Arsenal. A military force was organized in the Arsenal in April 1861, under federal auspices by Congressman Francis Preston Blair, Jr., and Captain Nathaniel Lyon; Boernstein was elected colonel of the Second Missouri Volunteer Regiment (of four regiments).  Before his election as colonel, his company escorted weapons and ammunition by boat from the Arsenal to Alton, Illinois. He participated in the arrest of the Missouri State Militia at Camp Jackson on May 10, 1861, and wrote a letter to Lincoln with a description of the subsequent shooting of civilians under riot conditions.  When Lyon (now a Brigadier General) moved into the interior of Missouri in June, Boernstein commanded the force occupying Jefferson City, the state capital.

After the expiration of three months' federal service, Boernstein was appointed United States Consul in Bremen, Germany, by President Lincoln, although he returned briefly to St. Louis in 1862 in a vain attempt to save Blair's Congressional seat for the Republican Party.

Europe again
Boernstein served as US Consul in Bremen throughout the Civil War and was only replaced by President Andrew Johnson in 1866.  Boernstein decided to remain in Europe, since the Anzeiger had been unexpectedly closed. In 1869-71 he leased the Theater in der Josefstadt in Vienna and later reviewed scripts of plays for the Stadttheater.  He worked in Vienna for a while as a photographer.  He retired in 1878 to Baden bei Wien to write his memoirs; they were published in the Illinois Staatszeitung of Chicago and as a two volume book in two editions, in 1881 and 1884.

A street is named after him in the Strebersdorf district of Vienna.  His grave in the Protestant cemetery of Vienna, Matzleinsdorfer Friedhof, was obliterated by authorities in 1941.

Notes

References
 Adam Arenson, The Great Heart of the Republic:  St. Louis and the Cultural Civil War (Cambridge, MA:  Harvard University Press, 2011).
 
 Henry Boernstein, The Mysteries of St. Louis, Friedrich Muench tr., Steven Rowan, Elizabeth Sims, eds. (Chicago: Kerr, 1990); German text in the Wright Series of American fiction; Czech version is Tajnosti St. Louiské:  roman (Racine, WI, 1878), google books. 
 Henry Boernstein, Memoirs of a Nobody:  The Missouri Years of an Austrian Radical, 1849-1866. ed. and tr. Steven Rowan (St. Louis: Missouri Historical Society Press, distributed by Wayne State University Press, 1998) [It translates vol. 1, pp. 443–48, vol. 2, pp. 1–402, 444-45]; German text Heinrich Börnstein, Fünfundsiebzig Jahre in der Alten und Neuen Welt.  Memoiren eines Unbedeutenden, 2 vols. (Leipzig, O. Wigand, 1881; 2d ed., 1884; reprint, with an English language preface by Patricia Herminghouse, New York:  Peter Lang, 1986).
  Currently the major reference, with snippets from Stevens (1915) and Wittke (1952) as noted.
 Wilhelm Kaufmann, The Germans in the American Civil War, edited by Don Heinrich Tolzmann with Werner D. Mueller and Robert D. Ward, Steven Rowan tr. (Carlisle, PA: John Kallmann Publishers, 1999). German text Deutschen im amerikanischen Bürgerkrieg (Munich:  Oldenbourg, 1911).
 Steven Rowan, James Neal Primm, Germans for a Free Missouri:  Translations from the St. Louis Radical Press, 1857-1862 (Columbia, MO:  University of Missouri Press, 1983).
 
 100 People Who Shaped St. Louis, St. Louis Magazine, December 2007.
 Alfred Vagts, "Heinrich Börnstein, Ex- and Repatriate," Bulletin of the Missouri Historical Society, 12 (1955/56), 105-27.
 Vorwärts!  Pariser Signale aus Kunst. Wissenschaft, Theater, Musik und geselligen Leben.  Ab 3.7.1844:  Pariser Deutsche Zeitschrift, 1844-1845.  ed. Heinrich Börnstein with L. F. C. Bernays, Arnold Ruge, Heinrich Heine, Karl Marx, Friedrich Engels, facsimile reprint, introduction by Walter Schmidt. (Leipzig:  Zentralantiquariat der Deutschen Demokratischen Republik, 1975).

Works 
 Der Herzog von Olonne. Komische Oper in drei Aufzügen. Zum ersten Male aufgeführt in dem Théatre royal de l'opéra comique, am 4. Februar 1842.  Die Musik ist von Auber. Nach dem Französischen der Herren Scribe und Saintine von Heinrich Börnstein. Schott, Mainz 1842 MDZ reader (auch Königsberg 1843)
 Eugene Sue: Die Geheimnisse von Paris. 8 Bde. und 4 Supplement-Bde. Mit Illustrationen von Theodor Hosemann. Deutsch von A. Diezmann und Heinrich Börnstein. Meyer & Hofmann, Berlin 1843
 Franciska oder Das Kriegsgericht. Schauspiel in 3 Aufzügen. Nach dem Französischen von Heinrich Börnstein. Bloch, Berlin 1843
 Arien und Gesänge aus: Carlo Broschi. Komische Oper in drei Akten. Nach dem Französischen "La part du diable" de Scribe. Music by Auber. Für die deutsche Bühne bearbeitet von H. Börnstein und C. Gollmick. Berlin 1843 
 Des Teufels Antheil. Komische Oper in 3 Akten. Nach dem Französischen des Scribe, by Heinrich Börnstein and Karl Gollmick. Musik von Auber. Schott, Mainz 1843 MDZ- DFG
 Die Geheimnisse von St. Louis. 2 Bde. Hotop, Cassel 1851
 Haus-Bibliothek des Anzeigers des Westens, ed. by Heinrich Börnstein. Bd. 1–2, St. Louis, Mo. 1855 Google books 
 Mein Mann geht aus! Lustspiel in 2 Aufzügen frei nach Scribe. Verl.-Coniptoir (Niemeyer), Hamburg 1857 (In: Das Theater d. Auslandes in Bearb. Bd 6, Lfg. 6)
 Friedrich Schillers Leben, der Charakter seiner Schriften und seines Strebens. Zum 100jähr. Geburtstage unseres Dichters, 10. Nov. 1859. Vorgetragen von Heinrich Börnstein bei der Schillerfeier in Saint Louis, Missouri. Scharmann, St. Louis 1859
 Die Geheimnisse von St. Louis. Bd. 1. Verlags-Bureau, Hamburg 1868 MDZ Reader
 Die Geheimnisse von St. Louis. Bd. 2. Verlags-Bureau, Hamburg 1868 MDZ reader
 Die Geheimnisse von St. Louis. Bd. 3. Verlags-Bureau, Hamburg 1868 MDZ reader	
 Die Geheimnisse von St. Louis. Bd. 4. Verlags-Bureau, Hamburg 1868 MDZ reader		
 Italien in den Jahren 1868 und 1869 2 Bde. in 1 Bd. Otto Jahnke, Berlin 1870 Vol. 1 Google books
 Fünfundsiebzig Jahre in der Alten und Neuen Welt. Memoiren eines Unbedeutenden. 2 Bde. Otto Wigand, Leipzig 1881 (2. ed. 1884) only Vol. 1 American Libraries

1805 births
1892 deaths
German-American Forty-Eighters
American political activists
19th-century American diplomats
People of Missouri in the American Civil War
19th-century American newspaper publishers (people)
Publishers (people) of German-language newspapers in the United States
Union Army colonels
19th-century American journalists
American male journalists
Journalists from Vienna
19th-century American male writers